The 1992 United States presidential election in New Mexico took place on November 3, 1992, as part of the 1992 United States presidential election. State voters chose five electors to the Electoral College, who voted for president and vice president.

New Mexico was won by Governor Bill Clinton (D-Arkansas) with 45.90 percent of the popular vote over incumbent President George H.W. Bush (R-Texas) with 37.34 percent. Businessman Ross Perot (I-Texas) finished in third, with 16.12 percent of the popular vote. Clinton ultimately won the national vote, defeating incumbent President Bush.

As a result of his win, Clinton became the first Democratic presidential candidate since Lyndon B. Johnson in 1964 to win the state. However, this election would mark a major shift in the state's politics, and it would vote Democrat for every election after this except in 2004 when Bush's son George W. Bush very narrowly won the state over John Kerry.

This was the 20th U.S. presidential election that New Mexico participated in since 1912.

Results

Results by county

References

New Mexico
1992
1992 New Mexico elections